Michael Tong Man-lung (Chinese: 唐文龍; Cantonese Romanization: Tong Man Lung (Tang Wen Long); born 17 November 1969) is a Hong Kong actor.

Filmography

TV series
Return of the Cuckoo (2000)
The Kung Fu Master (2000)
Healing Hands 2 (2000)
Armed Reaction II (2000)
In a Realm of Success (2001)
Family Man (2002)
Trust of a Lifetime (2002)
Perish in the Name of Love (2003)The 'W' Files (2003)Riches and Stitches (2003)Healing Hands 3 (2004)Hard Fate (2004)To Catch the Uncatchable (2004)The Biter Bitten (2006) Flaming Butterfly (2008) (ATV)Heart and Greed (2017)

FilmsHero of City (2001)Troublesome Night 18 (2003)Seamy Side of Life II - Crying Stars (2003)Unplugging Nightmare (2004)Magic Kitchen (2004)Man of Tai Chi (2013)Firestorm (2013)To Love Somebody (2014)Tomb Robber (2014)Be Together (2015)Scary Road Is Fun (2015)Return Of The Cuckoo (2015)Shock Wave (2017)Ip Man and Four Kings'' (2019)

References

External links

Hong Kong male actors
TVB actors
1969 births
Living people